Cronberry railway station was a railway station serving the hamlet of Cronberry, East Ayrshire, Scotland. The station was originally part of the Glasgow, Paisley, Kilmarnock and Ayr Railway.

History 
The station opened on 9 August 1848, and closed on 10 September 1951. The Annbank-Cronberry line opened for goods on 11 June 1872 and for passengers on 1 July 1872. The section of the line from Auchinleck to Cronberry, including the Mosshouse viaduct, remained open until December 1976 for coal traffic out of the Gaswater siding.

References

Notes

Sources 
 
 Thomas, John (1971). A Regional History of the Railways of Great Britain. V.6, Scotland. David & Charles : Newton Abbot. .

External links
Video footage of railway infrastructure in the Cronberry area

Disused railway stations in East Ayrshire
Railway stations in Great Britain opened in 1848
Railway stations in Great Britain closed in 1951
Former Glasgow and South Western Railway stations